Rasmus Hansen (born 15 February 1979) is a retired Danish professional football midfielder, who last played for FC Skanderborg. As of August 2011, he has started at Law School in Aarhus.

External links
 Career statistics at Danmarks Radio

References 

1979 births
Living people
Danish men's footballers
Danish expatriates in Iceland
Denmark under-21 international footballers
Expatriate footballers in Iceland
Brabrand IF players
Expatriate footballers in Fiji

Association football midfielders